Crypto-Judaism is the secret adherence to Judaism while publicly professing to be of another faith; practitioners are referred to as "crypto-Jews" (origin from Greek kryptos – , 'hidden').

The term is especially applied historically to Spanish Jews who outwardly professed Catholicism, also known as Conversos, Marranos, or the Anusim. The phenomenon is especially associated with Renaissance Spain, following the Massacre of 1391 and the expulsion of the Jews in 1492.

Europe
Officially, Jews who converted in Spain during the 14th and 15th centuries were known as Cristianos Nuevos (New Christians), but were commonly called conversos (converts [to Christianity]). Spain and Portugal passed legislation restricting their rights in the mother countries of Spain and Portugal and their Spanish and Portuguese colonies in the Americas.

Although only Cristianos Viejos (Old Christians) who could prove limpieza de sangre (cleanliness of blood) descent from Christian Iberian European ancestry only, without tainting of any Jewish ancestry or Muslim Berber/Arab ancestry, were allowed to officially migrate to the New World Spanish colonies, many Jewish-origin Christian conversos nevertheless ventured directly to the Spanish colonies on forged limpieza de sangre documents, or they entered the Spanish colonies via Brazil. The entry requirements to the Portuguese colony of Brazil were more lax and also less rigorously enforced.

Despite the dangers of the Inquisition in Spain and its franchises in the Americas, many conversos continued to secretly and discreetly practice Jewish rituals in the home, such as the Festival of Santa Esterica, a disguised version of Purim to celebrate the Jewish Queen Esther with a fictional “Catholic” Saint Esterica.

After the Alhambra decree of 1492, numerous conversos, also called Xueta (or Chueta) in the Balearic Islands ruled by Spain, publicly professed Roman Catholicism but privately adhered to Judaism, even through the Spanish Inquisition. They are among the most widely known and documented crypto-Jews.

Crypto-Judaism existed also in earlier periods, whenever Jews were forced or pressured to convert to the majority religion by the rulers of places where they resided. Some of the Jewish followers of Sabbatai Zevi (Sabbateans) formally converted to Islam and were known as Dönmeh. Later followers of Jacob Frank ("Frankists") formally converted to Christianity but maintained aspects of practice of their versions of Judaism.

Crypto-Jews persisted in Russia and Eastern European countries influenced by the Soviet Union after the rise of Communism with the Russian Revolution of 1917.  The government, which included secular Communist Jews, did not force Jews to convert to the Russian Orthodox Church but regarded the practice of any religion as undesirable. Some faiths were allowed to continue under strict supervision by the regime.  Since the end of Communism, many people in former Soviet states, including descendants of Jews, have publicly taken up the faith of their ancestors again.

The "Belmonte Jews" of Portugal, dating from the 12th century, maintained strong secret traditions for centuries. A whole community survived in secrecy by maintaining a tradition of endogamous marriage and hiding all external signs of their faith. They and their practices were discovered only in the 20th century. Their rich Sephardic tradition of crypto-Judaism is unique. Some now profess Orthodox Judaism, although many still retain their centuries-old traditions.

Role of Maimonides
As one of the towering figures in Judaism and the author of the Mishneh Torah commentary on the Talmud, Maimonides also issued a landmark doctrinal response to the forced conversions of Jews in the Iberian peninsula by the Almohads:

In his Epistle on Martyrdom, however, Maimonides suggested that the persecuted Jew should publicly adopt Islam while maintaining crypto-Judaism and not seek martyrdom unless forced to transgress Jewish commandments in public. He also excoriated one writer who advocated martyrdom for "long-winded foolish babbling and nonsense" and for misleading and hurting the Jews. In a sweeping view of the Jewish past, Maimonides marshals examples of heretics and sinners from the Bible to show that even oppressors of Israel were rewarded by God for a single act of piety or respect. How much greater then, he argues, will be the reward of the Jews "who despite the exigencies of forced conversion perform commandments secretly."

Maimonides championed rationalism over the then-accepted practice of martyrdom when facing religious adversity. This consequently legitimized crypto-Judaism by the religion's standards and provided doctrinal backing for Jews during the centuries of the Spanish Inquisition (1478–1834).

Before the Spanish Inquisition
According to the Encyclopaedia Judaica, several incidents of forced conversions happened prior to 1492 and outside of Iberia. One of the earliest conversions happened a century after the Fall of Rome and was in Clermont-Ferrand. After a member of the Jewish community in Clermont-Ferrand became a Jewish Christian and was persecuted by other members of the community for doing so, the cavalcade in which he was marching persecuted his persecutors in turn:

The participants in the procession then made an attack "which destroyed [the synagogue] completely, razing it to the grounds." Subsequently, Bishop *Avitus directed a letter to the Jews in which he disclaimed the use of compulsion to make them adopt Christianity, but announced at the end of the missive: "Therefore if ye be ready to believe as I do, be one flock with us, and I shall be your pastor; but if ye be not ready, depart from this place." The community hesitated for three days before making a decision. Finally the majority, some 500, accepted Christianity. The Christians in Clermont greeted the event with rejoicing: "Candles were lit, the lamps shone, the whole city radiated with the light of the snow-white flock" (i.e., the forced converts). The Jews who preferred exile left for *Marseilles (Gregory of Tours, Histories, 5:11). The poet Venantius Fortunatus composed a poem to commemorate the occasion. In 582 the Frankish king Chilperic compelled numerous Jews to adopt Christianity. Again the anusim were not wholehearted in their conversion, for "some of them, cleansed in body but not in heart, denied God, and returned to their ancient perfidy, so that they were seen keeping the Sabbath, as well as Sunday" (ibid., 6:17).

The Clermont-Ferrand conversions preceded the first forced conversions in Iberia by 40 years. Forced baptisms of Jews took place in Iberia in 616 at the insistence of Visigoth monarch Sisibut:

Persistent attempts to enforce conversion were made in the seventh century by the Visigoths in Spain after they had adopted the Roman Catholic faith. Comparatively mild legal measures were followed by the harsh edict issued by King Sisibut in 616, ordering the compulsory baptism of all Jews. After conversion, however, the anusim evidently maintained their Jewish cohesion and religious life. It was undoubtedly this problem that continued to occupy Spanish sovereigns at the successive Councils of Toledo representing both the ecclesiastical and secular authorities...Thus, steps were taken to secure that the children of converts had a Christian religious education as well as to prevent the older generation from continuing to observe the Jewish rites or from failing to observe the Catholic ones. A system of strict supervision by the clergy over the way of life and movements of the anusim was imposed...

Neofiti
The Neofiti were a group of crypto-Jews living in the Kingdom of Sicily, which included all of Southern Italy from the 13th to the 16th centuries.

Susiti
The ancestral line Sus, Süßkind and Lindauer was a crypto-Jewish susitic ancestral line that settled in the Holy Roman Empire and lived as Catholic or Protestant crypto-Jews. Secondary lineages of the Lindauer are:  Lindauere, Lindouer, Lindaer, Linduaer, Lindeaur, Lindeauer, Lindhauer, Linndauer, Lindayer as well as Lindaurr.

Mediterranean and Asia
There have been several communities of crypto-Jews in Muslim lands.  The ancestors of the Daggatuns in Morocco are thought to have kept up their Jewish practices a long time after their nominal adoption of Islam.  In Iran, a large community of crypto-Jews lived in Mashhad, near Khorassan, where they were known as "Jedid al-Islam"; they were mass-converted to Islam around 1839 after the Allahdad events. Most of this community left for Israel in 1946. Some converted to Islam and remained in Iran.

India

In 1494, after the signing of the Treaty of Tordesillas, authorized by Pope Alexander VI, Portugal was given the right to found colonies in the Eastern Hemisphere. In his lecture at the Library of Congress, Professor Sanjay Subrahmanyam, Chair in Social Sciences at University of California, Los Angeles, explains that crypto-Jews were especially attracted to India because not only was it a center of trade, but India had established an ancient Jewish settlements along its Western coast. The presence of these communities meant that crypto-Jews, who had been forced to accept Catholicism but did not want to emigrate to tolerant countries (e.g. Morocco, Poland, Ottoman Empire, etc.), could operate within the Portuguese Empire with the full freedom of Catholic subjects but away from the Inquisition while collaborating with existing Jewish communities to hide their true beliefs.

The presence of crypto-Jews in Goa angered the Archbishop of Goa, Dom Gaspar Jorge de Leão Pereira, and other Europeans like Francis Xavier who wrote polemics and letters to Lisbon urging that the Inquisition be brought to Goa. Crypto-Jews presented a security threat to the Kingdom of Portugal, because Sephardic Jews had an established reputation in Iberia for joining forces with Moors to overthrow Christian rulers. The Goan Inquisition commenced in 1560 and ended in 1812. It targeted crypto-Jews, crypto-Muslims, and crypto-Hindus. Of the 1,582 persons convicted between 1560 and 1623, 45.2% were convicted for offenses related to Judaism and Islam. A compilation of the auto-da-fé statistics of the Goa Inquisition reveal that a total of 57 persons were burnt in the flesh and 64 in effigy (i.e. a statue resembling the person).  All the burnt were convicted as relapsed heretics or for sodomy.

Spanish America 

Crypto-Judaism was documented chiefly in Spanish-held colonial territories in northern Mexico. Numerous conversos joined Spanish and Portuguese expeditions, believing there was an economic opportunity in the new lands, and that they would have more freedom at a distance far from Iberia. Different situations developed in the early colonial period of Mexico, the frontier province of Nuevo León, the later northern frontier provinces, and the colonial experience of the Mexican Inquisition The crypto-Jewish traditions have complex histories and are typically embedded in an amalgam of syncretic Roman Catholic and Judaic traditions. In many ways resurgent Judaic practices mirrored indigenous peoples' maintaining their traditions practiced loosely under a Roman Catholic veil. In addition, Catholicism was syncretic, absorbing other traditions and creating a new creole religion.

The traditional Festival of Santa Esterica was preserved among the Conversos who migrated to the New World and is still practiced today among their descendants.

Early colonial period—16th century
Some of the Sephardic Jews expelled from Spain went to Portugal, but in 1497 that country effectively converted all remaining Jewish children, making them wards of the state unless the parents also converted.  Therefore, many of the early crypto-Jewish migrants to Mexico in the early colonial days were technically first to second-generation Portuguese with Spanish roots before that. The number of such Portuguese migrants was significant enough that Spanish colonists began to use "Portuguese" as a synonym for "Jewish" for their settlers. Immigration to Mexico offered lucrative trade possibilities in a well-populated colony with nascent Spanish culture. Some migrants believed that this region would be more tolerant since the lands were overwhelmingly populated by non-Christian indigenous peoples and it was far removed from the metropole.

Colonial officials believed that many crypto-Jews were going to Mexico during the 16th century and complained in written documents to Spain that Spanish society in Mexico would become significantly Jewish. Officials found and condemned clandestine synagogues in Mexico City. At this point, colonial administrators instituted the Law of the Pure Blood, which prohibited migration to Mexico for New Christians (Cristiano Nuevo), i.e. anyone who could not prove to be Old Christians for at least the last three generations. In addition, the administration initiated the Mexican Inquisition to ensure the Catholic orthodoxy of all migrants to Mexico.  The Mexico Inquisition was also deployed in the traditional manner to ensure orthodoxy of converted indigenous peoples. The first victims of burnings (or autos de fé) of the Mexican Inquisition were indigenous converts convicted of heresy or crypto-Jews convicted of relapsing into their ancestral faith.

Except for those allowed to settle the province of Nuevo Leon under an exemption from the Blood Purity Laws, the number of conversos migrating to the New World was reduced.

Nuevo León (1590s to early 17th century)
The colonization of New Spain took place as a northward expansion over increasingly harsh geography, in regions that were occupied by tribes angered at the encroachment; they formed loose confederations of indigenous peoples to resist the settlers. Spain financed the expansion by exploiting mineral wealth, enslaving, or forcing indigenous peoples to labor in mines. It established encomiendas for raising livestock, thereby displacing the local people. The indigenous peoples of the North-Eastern quadrant of New Spain (Nueva España) proved particularly resistant to colonial pressures. The Chichimec, Apache, and other tribes resisted conversion to Christianity and avoided being impressed as laborers or slaves on Spanish ranches and in mines. The Spanish believed such peoples made the frontier (frontera) a lawless region.

Luis Carvajal y de la Cueva, a royal accountant, was a Portuguese New Christian. He received a royal charter from the Spanish Crown to settle Nuevo León, a large expanse of land in the hostile frontier. Because of the dangers and difficulties of this region, Carvajal y de la Cueva received an exemption in his charter from the usual requirement that he prove that all new settlers were "Old Christians" (of at least three generations) rather than recently converted Jews or Muslims.  This exemption allowed people to go to Nuevo León who were legally barred from entering New Spain elsewhere. Carvajal was authorized to bring 100 soldiers and 60 laborers to New Spain; many have been documented as crypto-Jews.

With Carvajal as governor, Monterrey was established as the center (now in the state of Nuevo León).  Within a few years, some people reported to authorities in Mexico City that Jewish rites were being performed in the Northern Province and efforts to convert heathen indigenous peoples were lax. The principal economic activity of Carvajal and his associates seems to have been capturing Indians and selling them into slavery. Carvajal's Lieutenant Governor, Gaspar Castaño de Sosa, led a large expedition to New Mexico in 1591 in an effort to establish a colony.  Castaño was arrested for this unauthorized expedition and sentenced to exile in the Philippines. The sentence was later reversed, but he had already been killed in the Molucca Islands when the Chinese slaves on his ship mutinied.

Governor Carvajal, his immediate family members, and others of his entourage were called to appear before the Inquisition in Mexico City.  They were arrested and jailed. The governor subsequently died in jail, prior to a sentence of exile. His niece Anna Carvajal had been tortured and implicated all the family in so-called charges. They were all executed by burning at the stake for relapsing into Judaism, except for one nephew who escaped arrest.

The governor's nephews changed their surname to Lumbroso. One of these was Joseph Lumbroso, also known as Luis de Carvajal el Mozo, who is said to have circumcised himself in the desert to conform to Jewish law. He was garroted to avoid being burned at the stake. His memoirs, letters and inquisition record were preserved and are held in the archive. Two other nephews also changed their names to Lumbroso and migrated to Italy, where they became noted rabbis.

When Carvajal was in office, the city of Monterrey became a destination for other crypto-Jews who wanted to escape the Mexican Inquisition in the south of the territory.  Thus, Nuevo León and the founding of Monterrey are significant as they attracted crypto-Jewish migrants from all parts of New Spain.  They created one of the earliest Jewish-related communities in Mexico.  (The Jewish communities in modern Mexico, which practice their Judaism openly, were not established until the late 19th and early 20th centuries, after considerable immigration of Ashkenazi Jews from eastern Europe, and Mizrahi Jews from Turkey and Syria.)

Former New Spain territories in the United States, 17th–18th centuries
Due to the Inquisition activities in Nuevo León, many crypto-Jewish descendants migrated to frontier colonies further west, using the trade routes passing through the towns of the Sierra Madre Occidental and Chihuahua, Hermosillo and Cananea, and to the north on the trade route to Paso del Norte and Santa Fe (both cities in the colonial Santa Fe de Nuevo Mexico). Some even traveled to Alta California on the Pacific Coast.

In the late 20th century, in modern-day Southwestern United States specifically New Mexico, which was a former territory of New Spain, several Hispanos of New Mexico have stated a belief that they are descended from crypto-Jews of the colonial period. While most maintain their Roman Catholic and Christian faiths, they often cite as evidence memories of older relatives practicing Jewish traditions. Since the 1990s, the crypto-Jews of New Mexico have been extensively studied and documented by several research scholars, including Stanley M. Hordes, Janet Liebman Jacobs, Schulamith Halevy, and Seth D. Kunin, who calls them Hispanos. Kunin noted that most of this group in New Mexico has not formally embraced Judaism nor joined the organized Jewish community. Though some have been sceptical, such as Folklorist Judith Neulander arguing that people could be referring to traditions of modern Ashkenazi Jews migrants and Evangelical Protestant Christians who purposely acquired and employed Jewish traditions. More recently, Evangelical Protestant Christians have opened missionary groups aimed at cultivating evangelical doctrine in Southwestern American communities where crypto-Judaism had survived. The highly influential Hordes has been charged with "single-minded speculation based on largely ephemeral or highly ambiguous evidence" for his conclusion that modern-day Hispanos who claim crypto-Jewish roots are heirs to an unbroken chain of transmission. Kunin responded to some of this criticism in his book Juggling Identities: Identity and Authenticity Among the Crypto-Jews, in the response Kunin iterated that these scholars were misunderstanding New Mexican identity which, while authentically tied to Christian and Pueblo historicity, is in line with other Spanish converso histories.

Peru
In Peru, conversos arrived at the time of the Spanish Conquest. At first, they had lived without restrictions because the Inquisition was not active there at the beginning of the Viceroyalty. With the advent of the Inquisition, New Christians began to be persecuted, and in some cases executed. The descendants of these colonial Sephardic Jewish descent converts to Christianity settled mainly in the north of the Andes and of the high jungle of Peru, where they married local women and became assimilated.

Colombia
In the department of Antioquia, Colombia, as well as in the greater Paisa region, some families also hold traditions and oral accounts of Jewish descent. In this population, Y-DNA genetic analysis has shown an origin of male founders predominantly from "southern Spain but also suggest that a fraction came from northern Iberia and that some possibly had a Sephardic origin". Medellín has a tradition of the marranada, where a pig is slaughtered, butchered and consumed on the streets of every neighborhood each Christmas. This custom has been interpreted as an annual affirmation of the rejection of Jewish law.

Bolivia
A safe haven destination for Sephardic Conversos during the Spanish colonial era was Santa Cruz de la Sierra. In 1557 many crypto-Jews joined Ñuflo de Chávez and were among the pioneers who founded the city. During the 16th century more crypto-Jews that faced persecution from the Inquisition and local authorities in nearby Potosí, La Paz and La Plata moved to Santa Cruz, as it was the most isolated urban settlement and because the Inquisition did not bother the Conversos there; Some settled in the city of Santa Cruz and its adjacent towns, including Vallegrande, Postrervalle, Portachuelo, Terevinto, Pucará, and Cotoca.

Several of the oldest Catholic families in Santa Cruz are of Jewish ancestry; some families still practice certain traditions of Judaism. As recently as the 1920s, several families preserved seven-branched candlesticks and served dishes cooked with kosher practices. It is still customary among certain old families to light candles on Friday at sunset and to mourn the deaths of close relatives by sitting on the floor. After almost five centuries, some of the descendants of these families acknowledge having some Jewish ancestry, but practice Catholicism.

Costa Rica
Some crypto-Jews established themselves in the outskirts of San José, Costa Rica in the 16th century. They passed as Catholics in public and practiced their Jewish rituals in privacy. In the town of Itzkazú (modern day Escazú), some crypto-Jewish families did not maintain secrecy. Locals started to associate their rituals and unintelligible prayers in Hebrew with witchcraft. Since then, Escazú has been known in Costa Rican folklore as the "city of the witches".

Elsewhere in Latin America

In addition to these communities, Roman Catholic-professing communities descended from male and female crypto-Jews are said to exist in the Dominican Republic, Cuba, Jamaica, Puerto Rico and in various other countries of South America, such as Brazil(see Synagogue Kahal Zur Israel in Recife), Argentina, Uruguay, Venezuela, Chile, Peru and Ecuador. From these communities comes the proverb, "Catholic by faith, Jewish by blood".

Notable crypto-Jews
Antonio Fernandez Carvajal was a Portuguese merchant in London; "like other Marranos in London, Carvajal prayed at the Catholic chapel of the Spanish ambassador, while simultaneously playing a leading role in the secret Jewish community, which met at the clandestine synagogue at Creechurch Lane."
Isaac Cardoso was a Jewish physician, philosopher, and polemic writer, who was born in Portugal but ultimately settled in Italy. For a time he went by the name Fernando to evade the Inquisition. After finding safe haven in Verona he openly embraced Judaism, becoming a leading scholar in Italy.
Benjamin Melendez was a Nuyorican activist, musician and gang leader. He is best known for brokering the New York City gang truce in 1971, while President of the South Bronx gang (and musical group) the Ghetto Brothers.

See also

Allahdad
Anusim
Beta Abraham
Chala
Conversos
Crypto-Christianity
Crypto-paganism
Crypto-Hinduism
Doctrine of mental reservation
Domus Conversorum
Dönmeh
Hidden Armenians
Jewish history
Jewish visibility
Judaizers
Limpieza de sangre
Marrano
Morisco
New Christian
 Relapso
Sephardic Jews in India
Who Is A Jew?
Kakure Kirishitan

Further reading

Acevedo-Field, Rafaela. "Denunciation of Faith and Family: Crypto-Jews and the Inquisition in Seventeenth-Century Mexico." PhD diss. University of California, Santa Barbara 2012.
Alberro, Solange. Inquisición y sociedad en México, 1571–1700. Mexico City: Fondo de Cultura Económica 1993.
Alberro, Solange. "Crypto-Jews and the Mexican Holy Office in the Seventeenth Century," in The Jews and the Expansion of Europe to the West, 1450–1800, eds. Paolo Bernardini and Norman Fiering. New York: Berghahn Books, 2001.
Arbell, Mordechai. The Jewish Nation of the Caribbean: The Spanish-Portuguese Jewish Settlements in the Caribbean and the Guianas. Jerusalem: Gefen Publishing House, 2002.
Beinart, Haim. Conversos ante la inquisición. Jerusalem: Hebrew University 1965.
Bocanegra, Matias de and Seymour Liebman, Jews and the Inquisition of Mexico: The Great Auto de Fe of 1649. Lawrence, Kansas: Coronado Press 1974.
Bodian, Miriam. Dying the Law of Moses: Crypto-Jewish Martyrdom in the Iberian World. Bloomington: Indiana University Press, 2007.
Böhm, Günter. "Crypto-Jews and New Christians in Colonial Peru and Chile." In The Jews and the Expansion of Europe to the West, 1450–1800, edited by Paolo Bernardini and Norman Fiering, 203–212. New York: Berghahn Books, 2001.
Cohen, Martin A. "The Letters and Last Will and Testament of Luis De Carvajal, the Younger." American Jewish Historical Quarterly, vol. 55, no. 4, 1966, pp. 451–520. .
Cohen, Martin A. "The Autobiography of Luis De Carvajal, the Younger." American Jewish Historical Quarterly, vol. 55, no. 3, 1966, pp. 277–318., .
Cohen, Martin A. The Martyr Luis de Carvajal: A Secret Jew in Sixteenth-century Mexico. Albuquerque: University of New Mexico Press 
Cohen, Martin A. "Antonio Díaz De Cáceres: Marrano Adventurer in Colonial Mexico." American Jewish Historical Quarterly, vol. 60, no. 2, 1970, pp. 169–184. .
Cohen, Martin A. "Some Misconceptions about the Crypto-Jews in Colonial Mexico." American Jewish Historical Quarterly 61 (1972): 277–293. .
Chuchiak, John F. IV. The Inquisition in New Spain, 1536–1820: A Documentary History. Baltimore: Johns Hopkins University Press 2012.
Cohen, Martin A. "Antonio Díaz De Cáceres: Marrano Adventurer in Colonial Mexico." American Jewish Historical Quarterly, vol. 60, no. 2, 1970, pp. 169–184., .
Corteguera, Luis R. Death by Effigy: A Case from the Mexican Inquisition. Philadelphia: University of Pennsylvania Press 2012.
Giles, Mary E. Women in the Inquisition: Spain and the New World. Baltimore: Johns Hopkins University Press 1999.
Gitlitz, David. Secrecy and Deceit: The Religion of the Crypto-Jews, Albuquerque, NM: University of New Mexico Press, 2002
Gojman Goldberg, Alicia. Los conversos en la Nueva España. Mexico City: Enep-Acatlan, UNAM 1984.
Gojman de Backal, Alicia. "Conversos" in Encyclopedia of Mexico, vol. 1, pp. 340–344. Chicago: Fitzroy Dearborn 1997.
Greenleaf, Richard E. The Mexican Inquisition in the Sixteenth Century. Albuquerque: University of New Mexico Press 1969.
Hordes, Stanley M. "The Inquisition as Economic and Political Agent: The Campaign of the Mexican Holy Office Against the Crypto-Jews in the Mid-Seventeenth Century." The Americas 39 no. 1 (1982) 2–38. .
Hordes, Stanley. To the End of the Earth: A History of the Crypto-Jews of New Mexico. New York: Columbia University Press 2005.
Israel, Jonathan I. Diasporas within a Diaspora: Jews, Crypto-Jews and the World Empires (1540–1740). Leiden: Brill, 2002.
Kagan Richard L., and Abigail Dyer, eds. Inquisitorial Inquiries: Brief Lives of Secret Jews and Other Heretics [2004]. 2nd ed. Baltimore: The Johns Hopkins University Press, 2011.
Kagan, Richard L., and Philip D. Morgan, "Preface." In Atlantic Diasporas: Jews, Conversos, and Crypto-Jews in the Age of Mercantilism, 1500–1800, edited by Richard L. Kagan and Philip D. Morgan, vii–xvii. Baltimore: The Johns Hopkins University Press, 2009.
Kamen, Henry. The Spanish Inquisition: A Historical Revision. New Haven: Yale University Press, 1997.
Kamen, Henry. The Spanish Inquisition. London: Weidenfeld and Nicolson 1965.
Lafaye, Jacques. Cruzadas y Utopias: El judeocristianismo en las sociedades Ibéricas. Mexico City: Fondo de Cultura Económica 1984.
Lanning, John Tate. "Legitimacy and Limpieza de Sangre in the Practice of Medicine in the Spanish Empire." Jahrbuch für Geschicte 4 (1967)
Lea, Henry Charles. The Inquisition in the Spanish Dependencies: Sicily, Naples, Sardinia, Milan, the Canaries, Mexico, Peru, and New Granada. New York: Macmillan 1908.
Lewin, Boleslao. Los criptojudíos: Un fenómeno religioso y social. Buenos Aires: Milá, 1987.
Liebman, Seymour. The Jews in New Spain: Faith, Flame, and the Inquisition. Coral Gables, FL: University of Miami Press 1970.
Liebman, Seymour B. "The Jews of Colonial Mexico." The Hispanic American Historical Review, vol. 43, no. 1, 1963, pp. 95–108. .
Liebman, Seymour. Los Judíos en México y en América Central. Mexico city: Siglo XXI 1971.
Martínez, Maria Elena. "Limpieza de Sangre" in Encyclopedia of Mexico, vol. 1, pp. 749–752. chicago: Fitzroy Dearborn 1997.
Martínez, Maria Elena. "Interrogating Blood Line: 'Purity of Blood,' the Inquisition, and Casta Categories" in Religion in New Spain, Susan Schroeder and Stafford Poole, eds. Albuquerque: University of New Mexico Press 2007.
Martínez, Maria Elena. Genealogical Fictions: Limpieza de sangre, religion, and gender in colonial Mexico. Stanford, Calif: Stanford University Press 2008.
Medina, José Toribio, Historia del Tribunal del Santo Oficio de la Inquisicion de Cartagena de las Indias. Santiago: Imprenta Elzeviriana, 1899.
Medina, José Toribio. Historia del tribunal del Santo Oficio de la Inquisición en México. 2nd edition. Mexico City 1954.
Parello, Vincent. "Inquisition and Crypto-Judaism: The 'Complicity' of the Mora Family of Quintanar de la Orden (1588–1592)." In The Conversos and Moriscos in Late Medieval Spain and Beyond, Volume One: Departures and Change, edited by Kevin Ingram, 187–199. Leiden: Brill, 2009.
Perelis, Ronnie. These Indians Are Jews!': Lost Tribes, Crypto-Jews, and Jewish Self-Fashioning in Antonio de Montezinos's Relación of 1644." In Atlantic Diasporas: Jews, Conversos, and Crypto-Jews in the Age of Mercantilism, edited by Richard L. Kagan and Philip D. Morgan, 195–211. Baltimore: The Johns Hopkins University Press, 2009.
Schaposchnik, Ana E. The Lima Inquisition: The Plight of the Crypto-Jews in Seventeenth- Century Peru. Madison: University of Wisconsin Press, 2015.
Schorsch, Jonathan. Swimming the Christian Atlantic: Judeoconversos, Afroiberians, and Amerindians in the Seventeenth Century, 2 vols. Leiden: Brill, 2009.
Seed, Patricia. To Love, Honor, and Obey in Colonial Mexico: Conflicts over Marriage Choices, 1574–1821. Stanford: Stanford University Press 1988.
Sicroff, Albert A. Los estatutos de limpieza de sangre. Translated by Mauro Armiño. Madrid: Tauros 1985.
Studnicki-Gizbert, Daviken.  A Nation upon the Ocean Sea: Portugal’s Atlantic Diaspora and the Crisis of the Spanish Empire, 1492–1640. Oxford: Oxford University Press 2007. 
Ushmany, Eva Alexandra. La vida entre el judismo y el cristianismo en la Nueva España, 1580–1606. Mexico: Fondo de Cultura Económico 1992.
Ushmany, Eva Alexandra. "The Participation of New Christians and Crypto-Jews in the Conquest, Colonization, and Trade of Spanish America, 1521–1660," in The Jews and the Expansion of Europe to the West, 1450–1800, Paolo Bernardini and Norman Fiering, eds. New York: Berghahn Books 1991.
Uchmany, Eva Alexandra. La vida entre el judaísmo y el cristianísmo en la Nueva España, 1580–1606. Mexico City: Fondo de Cultura Económica, 1992.
Warshawsky, Matthew D. "Inquisitorial Prosecution of Tomás Treviño de Sobremontes, a Crypto-Jew in Colonial Mexico." Colonial Latin American Review 17, no 1 (2008) pp. 101–23. .
Wiznitzer, Arnold. "Crypto-Jews in Mexico during the Sixteenth Century." American Jewish Historical Quarterly, vol. 51, no. 3, 1962, pp. 168–214. .

References

External links
Resources > Medieval Jewish History > Expulsion from Spain and The Anusim The Jewish History Resource Center, Project of the Dinur Center for Research in Jewish History, The Hebrew University of Jerusalem
Donagraciaproject.org
The Story of Secret and Forcibly Converted Jews
Luis Carvajal's 400th Yartzheit
Society for Crypto Judaic Studies
History of the Jews in Greece
Crypto Jews/Anusim Resources 
Shavei Israel – a group that helps our lost brethren return
Beth HaDerech – Returning to Judaism
Chavura Zohar Yisrael-Crypto Jewish Outreach
Crypto Jewish Education
 3= New Christians and Old Christians in Portugal, written by António Nunes Ribeiro Sanches, in 1748, in Portuguese
 A history of the Marranos, by Cecil Roth
 Dramatic episodes of the Portuguese Inquisition, volume 1, by Antonio Baião, in Portuguese
 Dramatic episodes of the Portuguese Inquisition, volume 2, by Antonio Baião, in Portuguese
 Trial of Gabriel de Granada by the Inquisition in Mexico, 1642–1645, according to Cecil Roth, 'it gives a remarkably graphic impression of a typical Inquisitional case'
 Who Are the Crypto-Jews? by Dr. Henry Abramson

 
 
14th century in Al-Andalus
15th century in Al-Andalus
Converts to Roman Catholicism from Judaism
History of the conversos
History of the Jews in South America
Jewish Mexican history
Jewish Spanish history
Judaism in Spain
Puerto Rican Jews
Sephardi Jews topics
Spanish Inquisition
Passing (sociology)
Jewish Cape Verdean history
Jewish Portuguese history